Mark Lee (born September 11, 1984) is a Canadian professional ice hockey centre who currently plays for the Schwenninger Wild Wings of the Deutsche Eishockey Liga.

References

External links

1984 births
Living people
Bridgeport Sound Tigers players
Canadian ice hockey centres
Charlotte Checkers (1993–2010) players
EfB Ishockey players
Espoo Blues players
Florida Everblades players
Hartford Wolf Pack players
Ice hockey people from Newfoundland and Labrador
Ilves players
Kansas City Outlaws players
P.E.I. Rocket players
People from Mount Pearl
Trenton Titans players
Canadian expatriate ice hockey players in Denmark
Canadian expatriate ice hockey players in Finland